Norika Tamura (born 20 June 1991) is a Japanese fencer. She competed in the women's individual sabre event at the 2018 Asian Games, winning the bronze medal.

References

External links
 

1991 births
Living people
Place of birth missing (living people)
Japanese female sabre fencers
Fencers at the 2020 Summer Olympics
Olympic fencers of Japan
Fencers at the 2018 Asian Games
Asian Games bronze medalists for Japan
Asian Games medalists in fencing
Medalists at the 2018 Asian Games
21st-century Japanese women